Shitepoke Creek is a short tributary of Salmon Creek, which is a tributary of the Middle Fork Willamette River in Lane County, Oregon, in the United States. Its entire course lies within the Willamette National Forest.

Shitepoke is said by the author of From Squaw Tit to Whorehouse Meadow: How Maps Name, Claim, and Inflame to refer to a heron's tendency to defecate while flying. Merriam-Webster says that the word, a combination of shite and poke, refers to a heron's tendency to defecate when startled. Noting that the word shite "is not now in decent use", The Compact Edition of the Oxford English Dictionary (OED) of 1971 defines shitepoke as "the small green heron of North America", Butorides virescens. The OED's usage example is: "gulls, shitepokes, cranes".

See also
List of rivers of Oregon

References

Rivers of Lane County, Oregon
Rivers of Oregon